Prilepac, or Prilepnica or Përlepnica, was a Serbian medieval fortress near Novo Brdo. It is most famous as the birthplace of Prince Lazar.

See also
Prilepnica (river)
Novo Brdo (fortress)
Prizrenac (fortress)
List of fortresses in Kosovo

References

External links
Grad Prilepac rodno mesto kneza Lazara rtvpuls.com 
Prilepac (Serbian Cyrillic: Прилепац) – video from the air (2017) facebook.com 

Medieval Serbian sites in Kosovo
Forts in Kosovo
Monuments and memorials in Kosovo
Lazarević dynasty